Shaista Lodhi is a Pakistani television host, and actress.

Early life and education
Lodhi was born in Karachi on 26 November 1977 to Ali Gohar Lodhi and Roshan Taj Lodhi. She grew up in a family with three brothers (Amir Lodhi, Tahir Lodhi and Sahir Lodhi). In 2000, she completed her MBBS from Jinnah Sindh Medical University.

Television career
Shaista started her career as a VJ in 2001. She was then asked to fill in as a host on a private TV channel. She was the host of the morning show Good Morning Pakistan, which aired on ARY Digital. At the end of September 2010, she joined GEO and hosted the morning show Utho Jago Pakistan on the same channel. The show was suspended on 15 May 2014 by the channel administration after alleged blasphemy during the show and she left Pakistan because of fears for her safety.

Shaishta then moved to South Africa with her three children and returned to Pakistan in 2015. She made her comeback in morning shows by hosting Sitare Ki Subah on Hum Sitaray. She also hosted Mehmaan Nawaz on SEE TV and then returned to Geo TV, hosting Geo Subah Pakistan from 30 January 2017.

In 2020, Shaista Lodhi was a captain of the Peshawar Stallions team in Jeeto Pakistan League in Ramadan Special.

In October 2021, she revealed that she would be hosting a morning show on PTV Home in the near future, replacing Nadia Khan. She made her debut on the show, Morning at Home, on 15 November 2021.

Personal life
She was previously known as Shaista Wahidi, In 1999, she married Waqar Wahidi, after which she came to be known as Shaista Wahidi. They got separated in 2012 and the marriage eventually ended in a divorce. She has three children from her first marriage.

She married for a second time in June 2015. Her second husband, Adnan Lodhi, is the first Pakistani art auctioneer in South Africa. Shaista's brother, Sahir Lodhi, also works in the TV industry.

Filmography

Television series

Telefilm

Reality shows

References

External links 
 

Pakistani television hosts
Pakistani women television presenters
Living people
People from Karachi
Pashtun people
21st-century Pakistani actresses
Jinnah Sindh Medical University alumni
Pakistani YouTubers
Pakistani television actresses
1971 births